Ewingia is a genus of mites in the family Acaridae.

Species
 Ewingia cenobitae Pearse, 1929
 Ewingia potamona Kaneko & Kadosaka, 1978

References

Acaridae